La Vérité sortant du puits armée de son martinet pour châtier l'humanité (English: Truth coming from the well armed with her whip to chastise mankind) is an 1896 painting by the French artist Jean-Léon Gérôme.

Overview
Beginning in the mid-1890s, in the last decade of his life, Gérôme made at least four paintings personifying Truth as a nude woman, either thrown into, at the bottom of, or emerging from a well. The imagery arises from a translation of an aphorism of the philosopher Democritus, "Of truth we know nothing, for truth is in a well". (Greek ἐτεῇ δὲ οὐδὲν ἴδμεν: ἐν βυθῷ γὰρ ἡ ἀλήθεια, eteêi dè oudèn ídmen: en buthô gàr hē alḗtheia, [literally] "in reality we know nothing; for the truth is in an abyss".) The nudity of the model may arise from the expression la vérité nue, "the naked truth".

At the Champs Elysées Salon of 1895, Gérôme showed a painting entitled Mendacibus et histrionibus occisa in puteo jacet alma Veritas (English: The nurturer Truth lies in a well, having been killed by liars and actors), in which he depicted "naked Truth killed by Falsehood, her body flung into a well and the mirror after her, from which flashes of light are cast as it lightens the dark abyss". At the next Salon in 1896, Gérôme showed Truth Coming Out of Her Well.

It has been assumed that both paintings (like a similar, later work by Édouard Debat-Ponsan) were comments on the Dreyfus affair, but art historian Bernard Tillier argues that Gérôme's images of Truth and the well were part of his ongoing diatribe against Impressionism.

In a preface for Émile Bayard's Le Nu Esthétique published in 1902, Gérôme uses the metaphor of Truth and the well to characterize the profound and irreversible influence of photography:

Gérôme kept at least one of the paintings. When he died in 1904, "the maid found him dead in the little room next to his atelier, slumped in front of a portrait of Rembrandt and at the foot of his own painting, Truth"—but the source for this anecdote, the biographer Charles Moreau-Vauthier, does not specify which painting of Truth.

Since 1978, Truth Coming Out of Her Well has been part of the permanent exhibition at the Musée Anne de Beaujeu in Moulins, France. In 2012, after the painting traveled to Los Angeles, Paris and Madrid, the museum featured the exhibition La vérité est au musée ("Truth is at the Museum"), which collected numerous drawings, sketches, and variants made by Gérôme, and by other artists, relating to the painting and its theme. The multiple interpretations of the painting's enigmatic meaning prompted one of the museum's curators to say, "C'est notre Joconde à nous." ("This is our Mona Lisa.")

See also
 Veritas
 Dreyfus affair

References

External links
La Vérité est au musée—press kit for the 2012 exhibit at the Musée Anne-de-Beaujeu (in French)

1896 paintings
19th-century allegorical paintings
Allegorical paintings by French artists
Nude art
Paintings by Jean-Léon Gérôme
Paintings in Auvergne-Rhône-Alpes